Dorcadion perezi is a species of beetle in the family Cerambycidae. It was described by Graells in 1849. It is known from Spain.

Subspecies
 Dorcadion perezi cercedillanum Pic, 1900
 Dorcadion perezi ghilianii Chevrolat, 1862
 Dorcadion perezi hispanicum Mulsant, 1851
 Dorcadion perezi nudipenne Escalera, 1908
 Dorcadion perezi ortunoi (Hernandez, 1991)
 Dorcadion perezi perezi Graells, 1849

See also 
Dorcadion

References

perezi
Beetles described in 1849